The Dramatics are an American soul music vocal group, formed in Detroit, Michigan, in 1964. They are best known for their 1970s hit songs "In the Rain" and "Whatcha See Is Whatcha Get", both of which were Top 10 Pop hits, as well as their later 1993 collaboration "Doggy Dogg World" with Snoop Dogg, a top 20 hit on the Billboard Rhythmic Top 40.

Career
The Dramatics, founded by Ron Banks (May 10, 1951 – March 4, 2010), Larry Demps, Rod Davis, Elbert Wilkins and Larry Reed, originally formed in 1964. They were originally known as the Sensations, but changed their billing to the Dramatics in 1965. Their first release in 1965 entitled "Bingo" was recorded for Wingate, a division of Golden World Records in Detroit, Michigan. By 1967, Motown had absorbed the entire Golden World Records operation. The Dramatics then moved to another local Detroit label, Sport Records, where they garnered their first minor hit single, "All Because of You". After becoming a victim in the July 1967 Algiers Motel incident, including the police killing of the group's valet Fred Temple, Reed and Davis eventually left the group, and were replaced by William Wee Gee Howard and Willie Ford (July 10, 1950 – May 28, 2019) in 1969.
 
The Dramatics signed with Stax Records of Memphis, Tennessee in 1968, but moved on after one unsuccessful release, the 1969 Temptations-inspired tune "Your Love Was Strange" (Volt VOA 4029), written by group members Ron Banks, William "Wee Gee" Howard, and Elbert "Al" Wilkins, which got regional airplay, but never charted nationally. This song was re-released as the "B" side to the hit, "Toast To The Fool" (Volt VOA 4082) three years later. However, producer Don Davis re-signed them to Volt, a Stax subsidiary, in 1971 after the group teamed up with Detroit writer-producer, Tony Hester. They broke through with their first release recorded with Hester, "Whatcha See Is Whatcha Get", which Hester offered them after seeing the group perform in a Detroit nightclub. The song went into the Top 10 of the Billboard Hot 100, peaking at number 9 and climbing to number 3 in the R&B chart.  "Whatcha See Is Whatcha Get" was awarded gold disc status by the R.I.A.A. in December 1971.

Their members at this time were Ron Banks (who died of a heart attack on March 4, 2010, at the age of 58), William "Wee Gee" Howard (who died of a heart attack on February 22, 2000, at the age of 49), Elbert Wilkins (who died of a heart attack on December 13, 1992, at the age of 45), Willie Ford (who died May 28, 2019, at the age of 68), and Larry Demps. These five members are often thought of as the original Dramatics, though it is more accurate to call them "the Classic Five", as only Ron Banks, Larry Demps and Elbert Wilkins were part of the original line-up. This quartet are the five singers that the general public first got to know as the Dramatics.

Shortly after the success of their first album, Howard and Wilkins left the group, and formed their own version of The Dramatics, recording the single "No Rebate On Love" on Mainstream Records. They were replaced by Larry James "L.J." Reynolds and Leonard "Lenny" Mayes (who died of lung cancer on November 8, 2004, at the age of 53). At the urging of Don Davis and Stax Records, the original group changed its billing to "Ron Banks and the Dramatics". These two groups toured the concert circuit for four years before Banks' group won a court battle, when they bought Howard and Wilkins out and gained full access to the name. Howard and Wilkins were forced to change the name of their group to "A Dramatic Experience". Banks, Demps and Ford then had the trademark rights to the name, and then extended that right to Mayes and Reynolds.

Through the 1970s, the group continued to have successful songs, including the Top 10 Pop, number 1 R&B hit, "In the Rain" in 1972, "Hey You! Get Off My Mountain" (number 5 R&B), "Me and Mrs Jones" (number 4 R&B), originally recorded by Billy Paul three years earlier, "Be My Girl" (number 3 R&B), and "Shake It Well" (number 4 R&B). "In the Rain" also reached number 5 on the Hot 100 pop chart and was their second million-seller.

The group recorded for Don Davis' Groovesville and later Great Lakes music production companies during the 1970s, although the recordings appeared on several labels. The group moved from Volt in 1974 after three albums, releasing one album on Chess Records' subsidiary Cadet, sharing tracks with The Dells, who were also being produced by Davis at the time. The group then signed for ABC in 1975 and transferred five years later to MCA, after ABC closed following its buy-out by MCA. Many of the Dramatics' songs initially were written and produced by Tony Hester, including all the tracks on the first two Volt albums. Davis, then Banks and Reynolds took over production later in the 1970s and the early 1980s.

In 1982, the group moved to Capitol Records and made their first album without Don Davis, with Banks acting as producer. Only Banks, Ford and Mayes remained in the group. L.J. Reynolds left to go solo in 1981 and Larry Demps decided to go into teaching and spend more time with his family, after having joined the group's original line-up in 1964 with Banks. When Ron Banks also decided to try a solo career, the group disbanded for a few years, but re-formed in the mid-1980s, with Howard returning to join Reynolds, Mayes, Ford and Banks to record for Fantasy Records.

From 2012 there were two groups of The Dramatics. One group was led by L.J. Reynolds, with Winzell Kelly, Leon Franklin, Donald Albert and Levell Thompson. The other group was led by the original member of The Dramatics, Willie Lee Ford, with Rick Littleton, Michael Brock, Douglas Gaddy and Gregory Finley, in 2017 long time member Paul Hill, of funk legend George Clinton’s Parliament Funkadelic band joined Willie Ford's Dramatics. The Dramatics Featuring Willie Ford focused on staying true to The Dramatics' original and easily recognizable concept of five part harmonies and five dynamic lead voices in the group, at their shows until his death at 68 years old, May 28, 2019 after having surgery. L.J. Reynolds' Dramatics featured the singing-talents of Reynolds and also included music from Reynolds' solo career at their shows. On September 24, 2018 L.J. Reynolds legally took the trademark rights to the name The Dramatics. 

The Dramatics were officially inducted into the R&B Music Hall of Fame at Cleveland State University's Waetejen Auditorium on Saturday August 17, 2013.

The Dramatics are depicted centrally in the 2017, Kathryn Bigelow film Detroit, a dramatization of the Algiers Motel incident.

Discography

Studio albums

 Album credited to Ron Banks & the Dramatics.

Live albums
Live (1988, Stax)
Greatest Hits Live (2002, Stax Records/Fantasy)

Compilation albums
The Best of the Dramatics (1974, Volt)
Be My Girl: Their Greatest Love Songs (1998, Hip-O)
Shake It Well: The Best of the Dramatics 1974-1980 (1998, MCA)
Say the Word: Their Greatest Love Songs, Vol. 2 (1999, Hip-O)
Ultimate Collection  (2000, Hip-O)
20th Century Masters - The Millennium Collection: The Best of the Dramatics  (2005, Hip-O)
The Very Best of the Dramatics  (2007, Stax)
Greatest Slow Jams  (2014, Stax)

DVDs
Biggest Hits Live (2009, Soul Concerts)

Singles

 Single credited to Ron Banks & the Dramatics

References

External links
 
 The Dramatics at Soul Express
 
  A feature on Lavel Jackson at Soul Express in March 2016
 The Dramatics Unsung TV Series

1964 establishments in Michigan
American soul musical groups
Musical groups from Detroit
Vocal quintets
American vocal groups
Northern soul musicians
American rhythm and blues musical groups
Stax Records artists